The Argentine Basin is a region of the Atlantic Ocean floor off the east coast of Argentina, between the Mid-Atlantic Ridge to the east and the Scotia Basin to the west. To the north is the Brazil Basin, with the two basins being separated by the Rio Grande Rise. The southern edge of the Argentine Basin is formed by the Malvinas/Falkland Escarpment.

The Antarctic Bottom Water current, which dominates the circulation in the abyssal layer of the southwest Atlantic, enters the southwest part of the Argentine Basin, then is deflected northward along the continental rise. It passes into the Brazil Basin through the Vema Channel (39° 30′ W) to the west of the Rio Grande Rise. Here, the current reaches velocities of 20–25 cm/s.

References

Landforms of the Atlantic Ocean